"The Cheerful Cuckold" is a 1969 Australian TV play. It was written by and stars Alan Hopgood.

Plot
It was about a young university lecturer (Hopgood) who is cuckolded by his wife Sybil (Sue Donovan). He devises a method to deal with it.

Cast
Alan Hopgood as Gareth
Sue Donovan as Sybil
Joseph James as Max
Robin Ramsay as Tony
Lyndel Rowe as Shirley
Michael Duffield as Professor Garraway

Production
The show was recorded in late 1968. The Age previewed it, calling it "a delight" in an article dated 27 December 1968.

Hopgood's script was awarded an Awgie in March 1969. The show was not broadcast until December 1969.

Reception
One critic called it "the most painful Australian production I have seen since television started."

The script won the Awgie Award.

References

External links
 
 
 
 Full script of "The Cheerful Cuckold" at National Archives of Australia

1960s Australian television plays
1969 Australian television episodes
1969 television plays
Australian Plays (season 1) episodes